Columbus Park is a park at the southern end of Cadman Plaza, in Brooklyn, New York City, United States.

Memorials
The park features the Robert F. Kennedy Memorial, statues of Christopher Columbus and Henry Ward Beecher, and a tree commemorating John F. Kennedy.

References

External links

Downtown Brooklyn
Parks in Brooklyn